Gustavo Kuerten was the defending champion but lost in the first round to Agustín Calleri.

Nicolás Massú won in the final 2–6, 7–6(7–5), 6–2 against Calleri.

Seeds

  Gustavo Kuerten (first round)
  Guillermo Cañas (first round)
  Nicolás Lapentti (second round)
  Albert Portas (first round)
  Félix Mantilla (second round)
  Alberto Martín (second round)
  Marcelo Ríos (second round)
  Gastón Gaudio (withdrew because of a back injury)

Draw

Finals

Top half

Bottom half

Qualifying

Qualifying seeds

Qualifiers

Lucky loser
  Hugo Armando

Special exempts

Qualifying draw

First qualifier

Second qualifier

Third qualifier

Fourth qualifier

References

External links
 Main draw (ATP)
 Qualifying draw (ATP)
 Tournament profile (ITF)

ATP Buenos Aires
2002 ATP Tour
ATP